is a Japanese tokusatsu science fiction television series created by Eiji Tsuburaya. It is a follow-up to Ultra Q, though not technically a sequel or spin-off. Eiji Tsuburaya's production company, Tsuburaya Productions, produced 39 episodes (40, counting the pre-premiere special) that aired on Tokyo Broadcasting System (TBS) and its affiliate stations from July 17, 1966, to April 9, 1967. Its premiere topped the average rating set by Ultra Q and kept climbing each week, marking the show as a success.

Although Ultraman is the first series to feature an Ultraman character, it is the second installment in the Ultra Series, following Ultra Q. This is symbolised by the Japanese show opening with the Ultra Q logo exploding into the Ultraman logo. Ultraman and its titular hero became a major pop culture phenomenon in Japan, generating dozens of sequels, spin-offs, imitations, parodies and tributes. Ultraman went on to generate  in merchandising revenue from 1966 to 1987 in Japan (equivalent to more than  adjusted for inflation) and become the world's third top-selling licensed character by the 1980s, largely due to his popularity in Asia.

A manga series of the same name serving as a sequel to the television series began publication in October 2011 and received an anime adaptation starting in April 2019. In May 2022, Toho released Shin Ultraman, a reimagining of the series directed by Shinji Higuchi.

Premise
The series follows the adventures of the Science Patrol, a special scientific team investigating and combating threats from aliens and kaiju. Unbeknownst to the team, fellow member Shin Hayata possesses the ability to transform into the giant alien superhero Ultraman in moments of crisis.

Production

Development
Due to the success of Ultra Q, Tokyo Broadcasting System (TBS) wanted a new monster-themed show from Tsuburaya Productions Company (TPC), this time filmed in color and with the hopes of continuing the series with TPC. Eiji Tsuburaya and writer Tetsuo Kinjo chose to take the barebones idea of Ultra Q about civilians and scientists dealing with monsters and have a group specifically created to deal with monsters and supernatural phenomena as the focus of the new show. The group was tentatively named the "Scientific Investigation Agency" (SIA). Tsuburaya and Kinjo decided to add unused ideas from Ultra Q and the rejected outline Woo.

Tsuburaya had spent significant amounts of studio money to build his miniatures for the Godzilla films. The studio was desirous to monetize these miniatures, and was looking for a project that could repurpose the sets and costumes from the Godzilla franchise. The first iteration of Ultraman was named "Bemler". Bemler's human host would have been a 28-year-old man named "Officer Sakomizu", described as a "tough guy" in early drafts. Captain Muramatsu would have been the only SIA member to know his secret identity. The name "Bemler" (sometimes trademarked as "Bemular") was later given to Ultraman's first foe in the premiere episode "Ultra Operation No. 1".

Pre-production and story layout for the show began in December 1965 as Bemler: Scientific Investigation Agency. Masahiro Yamada completed a sample teleplay titled The Birth of Bemler that featured an unused scenario originally written for Ultra Q. TBS producer Takashi Kakoi demanded to have Bemler be easily differentiated from other similarly designed monsters to avoid confusion. Tsuburaya and Kinjo then decided to make Bemler more humanoid in design. Kakoi later requested that Bemler have a more metallic-based image.

In January 1966, the production's title was changed to Redman, due to the protagonist's color scheme. The following month, the show was unanimously approved for production. In this version, Redman arrives as a refugee on Earth after invaders destroyed his home planet. Redman fuses with officer Sakomizu and together, they protect the Earth from giant monsters and alien invaders. This version also featured an early version of the transformation device the Beta Capsule called a "Flashbeam" that resembled a futuristic fountain pen. During casting TBS suggested casting actors that looked as Western as possible, in order to appeal to overseas markets. It was later decided to add a female character to the SIA roster. Many of the cast members came from Toho. On March 22, 1966, the copyright offices approved registration of the show, now titled Ultraman.

Design
The original design was a cross between Garuda, a mythological Hindu/Buddhist guardian bird, and Tengu, a Japanese folkloric crow-goblin. Eiji Tsuburaya found the early versions of Ultraman's design to be "too alien and sinister" and requested that production designer Tohl Narita continue drafting additional designs as teleplays were being written concurrently. Narita chose to root Ultraman's design in the Greek concept of cosmos (order and harmony), in contrast to Narita's monster designs for Ultra Q which were rooted in the Greek concept of khaos. Narita also took inspiration from classical Greek art, ancient Egypt, the European Renaissance, and Miyamoto Musashi. Tsuburaya and Kinjo also provided input to Narita's designs. Ultraman's silver skin symbolized steel from an interstellar rocket and the red lining represented the surface of Mars.

Narita's assistant, Akira Sasaki, sculpted clays, but became concerned about the nose and mouth looking too human. They eventually decided on a brim-like nose that runs from the mouth to the top of the head like a dorsal fin. They also allowed the mouth to be flexible for speech. Early outlines had Ultraman capable of spitting fire and a liquid called "silver iodine", but these ideas were later dropped. A three-minute warning light called the "Color Timer" was added at the last minute due to the filmmakers feeling that Ultraman was too invincible, and also the belief that it would add suspense and make viewers cheer for Ultraman.

Filming
A decision was made to film Ultraman in color. To keep production costs from going over budget, the show was shot on 16mm stock and optical effects were shot using 35mm. This met the network's requirement for making new episodes on a fast-paced production schedule, due to filming starting in March 1966 for a scheduled debut that July. The production crew were separated into three teams subdivided into separate live-action filming and special effects filming groups. TBS and Tsuburaya Productions originally agreed to air Ultraman on July 17. TBS pushed the release up one week in order to cover the spot originally intended for the final episode of Ultra Q, which was pulled from the broadcast schedule due to not featuring any monsters. TBS also wanted to beat the release of Fuji Television's Ambassador Magma (a.k.a.The Space Giants), a show similar to Ultraman.

Though production on Ultraman was running smoothly, it was not running fast enough to meet the premiere date. After meetings between TBS, Tsuburaya Productions, and sponsors, the decision was made to produce a live broadcast on July 10 of a special titled Ultraman Eve Festival, a TV special intended to introduce Ultraman to viewers. This was also done to help the production crew catch up and finish the premiere episode. The special was then retitled The Birth of Ultraman: An Ultraman Premiere Celebration. Kunio Miyauchi, who composed the music for Ultra Q, was brought back to compose the music for Ultraman. The lyrics to the show's opening theme music were written by Hajime Tsuburaya (credited as Koichi Fuji).

Monsters

Production designer Tohl Narita designed all of the monsters for the show. Narita sometimes deviated from the original descriptions. A majority of the time, the writers did not include any specific descriptions of the monsters in the teleplays. Most of the monsters were not named. The names of the monsters were decided via staff meetings, where it would also be determined if the writer had created a creature that was capable or incapable of being filmed with the special effects technology available at the time. The monsters were sculpted and fabricated by Ryosaku Takayama, Akira Sasaki, and Ekisu Productions.

Haruo Nakajima, who played Godzilla for the first 12 films in the Godzilla franchise, choreographed all the monsters' battles with Furuya and even played the monsters for episodes three and ten. Nakajima also had two cameos, one in episode 24 and one in episode 33 as a police officer. Ultraman featured new monster suits, as well as recycled suits from Ultra Q. Two Godzilla suits were recycled from Toho for the monster Jirahs, with the head of the Godzilla suit from Ebirah, Horror of the Deep placed upon the body of the Godzilla suit from Mothra vs. Godzilla. The dorsal fins and parts of the suit were sprayed yellow and a large yellow frill was added to disguise the connection of the head with the body. The show also marks the first appearance of Ultraman Zoffy in the finale Farewell, Ultraman.

Cast
Susumu Kurobe as Shin Hayata/Ultraman (voiced by Earl Hammond in the English dub):The Science Patrol member who transforms into Ultraman with the Beta Capsule. Bin Furuya portrayed Ultraman via rubber suit.
Akiji Kobayashi as Captain Toshio Muramatsu:Leader of the Science Patrol. In the Japanese version, he is sometimes referred to as "Cap". His name is shortened to "Captain Mura" in the English dub.
Sandayū Dokumamushi as Daisuke Arashi (voiced by William Kiehl in the English dub):The Science Patrol's expert marksman.
Masanari Nihei as Mitsuhiro Ide (voiced by Earl Hammond in the English dub):The Science Patrol's comical inventor. Susumu Ishikawa was originally cast in the role. Ishikawa filmed a few scenes but abruptly left the production due to contract disputes. The English dub renames the character as "Ido".
Hiroko Sakurai as Akiko Fuji (voiced by Corinne Orr in the English dub):The Science Patrol's communications officer.
Akihide Tsuzawa as Isamu Hoshino (voiced by Corinne Orr in the English dub):The Science Patrol's unofficial mascot. In the English dub, he is identified as Fuji's younger brother.
Akihiko Hirata as Dr. Iwamoto:The Science Patrol's scientific advisor.

Cast taken from Eiji Tsuburaya: Master of Monsters.

Episodes

  a live stage show pre-premiere special intended to introduce audiences to Ultraman prior to the premiere episode. It was also produced to give the filmmakers time to complete the debut episode.
  a theatrical film directed by Hajime Tsuburaya, consisting of re-edited footage from episodes 1, 8, 26, and 27. It was released by Toho Co., Ltd. on July 22, 1967, as a double feature with King Kong Escapes.
  a short film directed by Masahiro Tsuburaya, and released in March 1996.

English version

United Artists Television picked up the rights for Ultra Q and Ultraman in the fall of 1966, two months after the first episode of Ultraman aired. Ultra Q was dubbed but never broadcast in the United States due to American TV stations preferring color shows over black-and-white shows. Ultraman ran in and out of syndication until the mid-1980s. UA-TV also syndicated Ultraman internationally. Peter Fernandez, Corinne Orr, and Earl Hammond provided the voices for the dub. Fernandez also wrote and supervised the dub.

Describing the process, Fernandez said: "I had a Moviola, sometimes a projector, and I’d go back and forth over each line carefully and carefully, building the line to look like English." Fernandez also went on to explain that a grease pencil was used to mark scenes that needed to be dubbed, even if it were only a few lines. A loop of the film would be projected so that the voice actor could memorize his or her lines and see where the scene needed to be dubbed. The voice actors had to wait for a beeping signal before starting, Fernandez explained: "So in the studio you hear “Beep… beep… beep…” then you talk, as if there is a fourth beep. Those beeps are drilled into me. They are two-thirds of a second apart. Later on, the film is reassembled and mixed with the original music and sound effects." The English dub was featured in the BCI Eclipse DVD release of Ultraman, as well as subsequent DVD re-issues from Mill Creek Entertainment.

Home media

Japan
In April 2013, Tsuburaya held a press conference announcing the new Ultra Series show and character, Ultraman Ginga, where they also announced that the original 1966 show will be given an HD remaster treatment in Japan. In July 2013, Bandai Visual released an HD transfer of Ultraman on Blu-ray titled Ultraman HD Remaster 2.0, to commemorate the 50th anniversary of Tsuburaya Productions. Bandai Visual released the series on three separate box sets, each containing 13 episodes. The first box set was released on July 10, 2013, the second one on October 25, 2013, and the final one on January 29, 2014.

On November 25, 2020, Tsuburaya Productions and Pony Canyon released a 3.0 HD remaster of the series on Blu-ray titled Ultraman 55th Anniversary Ultraman Archives: Ultraman MovieNEX, suitable for large screen televisions. Composite technology EXA Quality Advanced Service (EQAS) was used to process the series to remove excess picture noise while retaining an appropriate level of graininess.

North America
BCI Eclipse Home Entertainment LLC officially released Ultraman on two separate DVD volumes in 2006 and 2007, licensed from then-rights holder Southern California-based Golden Media Group Inc. (via Tokyo-based UM Corporation). BCI's first DVD release featured the first 20 episodes, while the second release featured the final 19 episodes, all presented uncut, unedited and re-mastered in color with stereo sound. These releases also featured the original Japanese audio and the English dub. When Navarre folded BCI Eclipse in December 2008, the series was shuffled over to Navarre's other home video label, Mill Creek Entertainment. In June 2009, Mill Creek re-released the complete series set on September 29, 2009, in a four-disc set with the same special features from the previous release.

On July 10, 2019, Mill Creek Entertainment announced that it had acquired most of the franchise library from Tsuburaya Productions through Indigo Entertainment, including 1,100 episodes and 20 films. Mill Creek released the series on Blu-ray and digital on October 15, 2019, in standard and steelbook editions. Mill Creek released The Birth of Ultraman Collection on Blu-ray on July 10, 2020. It included the pre-premiere special and seven episodes from the 1966 series, which included the English dub. The Blu-ray featured artwork by Alex Ross (originally created for Marvel's Ultraman comic) and was sold exclusively on DeepDiscount.

In July 2020, Shout! Factory announced that they had struck a multi-year deal with Alliance Entertainment and Mill Creek, with the blessings of Tsuburaya and Indigo, that granted them the exclusive SVOD and AVOD digital rights to the Ultra series and films (1,100 episodes and 20 film) acquired by Mill Creek the previous year. Ultraman, amongst other titles, streamed on Shout! Factory TV and Tokushoutsu in the United States and Canada.

Post-release

Proposed sequels
Due to the show's success, a feature film titled Ultraman: Operation Giant was planned. Toshihiro Iijima was attached to write the script. The film was to be filmed in CinemaScope and was to introduce new characters, such as a self-sacrificing automaton built by the Science Patrol, the Baltans invading Earth with the help of a human scientist, a new subterranean monster named "Morugo", and Ultraman was to be given a new sword weapon. A sequel series tentatively titled  was also proposed; however, neither project ever materialized.

Adaptations
Harvey Comics Entertainment published two short comic book series based on Ultraman in 1993 and 1994. Bandai published the video game Ultraman for Super Famicom in 1990, and PD Ultraman Battle Collection 64 for the Nintendo 64 in 1997. The games were released in Japan only. In 2011, a manga adaptation simply titled Ultraman began serialization in Shogakukan's Monthly Hero's magazine. It serves as a sequel to the television series. It was released on August 18, 2015, in North America by Viz Media, who had received the rights on February 18, 2015. The manga was adapted into a 3DCG anime of the same name and released on Netflix in April 2019. In September 2020, Marvel Comics launched a monthly series titled The Rise of Ultraman.

In May 2022, Toho released a reimagining of the series, titled Shin Ultraman, directed by Shinji Higuchi. Using motion capture technology, Bin Furuya, the original Ultraman suit actor, portrays the titular hero alongside Hideaki Anno.

Legacy
Since its debut, both the show and character became international pop culture phenomena, inspiring rip-offs, imitators, parodies, tributes, and a multimedia franchise centered around spin-off characters based on Ultraman. The series has been recognized by Guinness World Records for "TV series with most number of spin-offs." Mark Schilling from The Japan Times called the series "a rite of passage for Japanese boys (and a few girls) and their families" since the series' debut and noted "the series is as much a part of the national fabric as furikake (rice topping) and chopsticks." SciFi Japan called the 1966 series "the gold standard of Japanese special effects television series." Ultraman has been parodied, tributed, and referenced in various media such as Ben 10, Ready Player One, The Simpsons, South Park, Kyoei Toshi, and Ant-Man. Chris Kirkpatrick, Will Smith, and Guillermo del Toro have cited the 1966 series as one of the shows they grew up watching as kids. Del Toro named Ultraman and Pigmon as his favorite characters from the show and cited Ultraman as an influence on Pacific Rim.

See also
 The Ultra Series — complete list of official Ultraman-related shows
 Bio Planet Woo

Notes

References

Sources

External links

Official website of Tsuburaya Productions 
Ultraman Connection — Official website 
Official Ultraman channel at YouTube

Ultraman
1966 Japanese television series debuts
1967 Japanese television series endings
Japanese action television series
Japanese science fiction television series
Military science fiction television series
Teleportation in fiction
Television series about orphans
Television series about shapeshifting
Television series set in the 1990s
TBS Television (Japan) original programming